The Charleston Sandstone is a geologic formation in West Virginia. It preserves fossils dating back to the Carboniferous period.

See also

 List of fossiliferous stratigraphic units in West Virginia

References
 

Carboniferous West Virginia
Carboniferous geology of Virginia
Carboniferous southern paleotropical deposits